The Yunnan keelback (Hebius parallelus) is a species of natricine snake which is endemic to Asia.

Geographic range
It is found in Bhutan, China (Tibet and Yunnan), Northeast India (Arunachal Pradesh, Assam, Sikkim, Nagaland) and Myanmar.

Description
Dorsally, it is brown with two parallel yellowish, black-edged stripes on the body and tail. The ventrals and subcaudals are uniform yellow, or with a black dot on each side. There is a black streak from the eye to the corner of the mouth, and the labials are yellow.

It may have one, two, or three preocular scales, and has three postoculars. There are seven or eight upper labials (usually eight), with the third, fourth, and fifth entering the eye. The temporals may be 1 + 1, 1 + 2, or 2 + 2.

Strongly keeled dorsal scales arranged in 19 rows at midbody. Ventrals 163–175; anal plate divided; subcaudals 73–95, also divided.

Adults may attain 56 cm (22 inches) in total length with a tail of 14 cm (5½ inches).

References

Further reading
 Boulenger, G.A. 1890. The Fauna of British India, Including Ceylon and Burma. Reptilia and Batrachia. Secretary of State for India in Council.  (Taylor and Francis, Printers). London. xviii + 541 pp. (Tropidonotus parallelus, p. 345.)

Hebius
Snakes of Asia
Reptiles of Bhutan
Snakes of China
Snakes of India
Reptiles of Myanmar
Fauna of Tibet
Fauna of Yunnan
Reptiles described in 1890
Taxa named by George Albert Boulenger